Pallipalayam Agraharam is a census town in Namakkal district, in the Indian state of Tamil Nadu.

It is located across the Kaveri River from Erode City, at a distance of about 7 km from Erode Junction and 4 km from the Erode bus stand.

Demographics

 India census, Pallipalayam Agraharam had a population of 10,829. Males constitute 52% of the population and females 48%. In Pallipalayam Agraharam, 10% of the population is under six years of age.

Schools
Rathna Matriculation School is located on the Komarapalayam main road very near to the Agraharam bus stop.

Vignesh primary and nursery school is located near the bus stop.

References

Cities and towns in Namakkal district